Nomura Research Institute, Ltd. (NRI; Japanese: 株式会社野村総合研究所 or 野村総研 for short) is the largest economic research and consulting firm in Japan, and a member of the Nomura Group.  Established in 1965, the firm now employs over 13,000 people. It owns ten subsidiaries in Japan and multiple subsidiaries overseas, in India, New York City, Dallas, London, Seoul, Shanghai, Beijing, Hong Kong, Moscow, Taipei, the Philippines, Singapore, Bangkok, and Jakarta.

In 2016 NRI acquired Cutter Associates.

Overview
Nomura Research Institute (Japan's first full-fledged private comprehensive think tank) and Nomura Computer Systems, Inc. (Japan's first systems development company to use commercial computers for business purposes) merged to form the current Nomura Research Institute, Ltd. With this merger, the company became a total provider of research, consulting, IT solutions, and system operations.

The company's strengths lie in management consulting and IT consulting for private companies and government agencies, as well as system integration and development for clients in the financial and retail industries. It is positioned No. 1 in 2018 and 2020 in the ranking of companies to watch, as selected by students at the University of Tokyo seeking employment. While it has certain capital ties with Nomura Holdings, it is not a subsidiary of Nomura Holdings. The corporate statement is "未来創発ーDream up the future." It is famous for its extremely high employee salary level, with an average annual salary of 12,352,000 yen in FY2019 (Annual Securities Report FY2020).

See also
 Nomura Group
 Think tank
 Management consulting
 IT consulting

References
 The Japanese Wikipedia page

External links
 NRI home page

International information technology consulting firms
Cloud computing providers
Computer security companies
Information technology consulting firms of Japan
Service companies based in Tokyo
Think tanks based in Japan
Companies listed on the Tokyo Stock Exchange
Nomura Holdings
1965 establishments in Japan